Toros University (Turkish:Toros Üniversitesi) is a private university, founded by a foundation. It is located in Mersin; a city on the Mediterranean coast of southern Turkey, famous for Turkey's largest seaport.

Description
The university is named after the Toros Mountains, a mountain complex in southern Turkey, separating the Mediterranean coastal region from the central Anatolian Plateau.

Toros University is one of the two private universities in Mersin Province along with Çağ University. Mersin also has two public universities: Mersin University and Tarsus University.

History
Toros University was officially founded on July 23, 2009 by the Mersin Education Foundation, an active educational foundation which was founded in 1979 in Mersin by a group of idealistic teachers who aimed to provide educational services.

Toros University accepted its first students for the academic year of 2009–2010.

Campuses
Toros University has five campuses: Bahçelievler, 45 Evler, Uray, Mezitli and 50.Yıl campuses.

All five campuses are centrally located in Mersin Province.

Faculties, Departments, Schools and Institutes 
Toros University comprises four faculties, two vocational schools and a graduate institute.

Faculties

Faculty of Economics, Administrative and Social Sciences 
Department of Business Administration
Department of International Finance and Banking
Department of International Trade and Logistics
Department of Psychology

Faculty of Engineering 
Department of Civil Engineering
Department of Electrical and Electronics Engineering
Department of Industrial Engineering
Department of Software Engineering

Faculty Of Fine Arts, Design and Architecture 
Department of Architecture
Department of Interior Architecture
Department of Urban and Regional Planning
Department of Urban Design and Landscape Architecture

Faculty of Health Sciences 
 Department of Health Management
 Department of Nursing
 Department of Nutrition and Dietetics
 Department of Physiotherapy and Rehabilitation

Vocational Schools of Higher Education

School of Occupational Higher Education 
 Construction Technology Program
 Culinary Program
 Food Technology Program
 Graphic Design Program
 Justice Program
 Mechatronics Program
Healthcare Vocational School

 Anesthesia Program
 Biomedical Device Technologies Program
 Child Development Program
Dialysis Program
 First and Emergency Aid Program
Medical Imaging Techniques Program
 Medical Laboratory Techniques Program
Opticianry Program
 Oral and Dental Health Program
 Physiotherapy Program
 Surgery Services Program

School of Foreign Languages
 Foreign Languages Program
English Translation and Interpreting Program

Institutes

Institute of Post Graduate Education

Research & Development Centers

Continuing Education Application and Research Center (TORSEM)

Alevism & Bektashism Application and Research Center

Education of Technology of Renewable Energy Application and Research Center

Urbanization and Local Administrations Application and Research Center (KEYAM)

Student organizations 
Toros University Student Organizations are as listed:

 Administration and Entrepreneurship Club
 American Football Group
 Animal Protection Group
 Atatürkist Thinkers Club
 Chess Club
 Child Development Group
 Civil Engineering Students Organization
 Community Health Association
 Computer Sciences Club
 Creative Hands Association
 Dance Club
 Drop Club
 Electrical and Electronics Engineers Club
 English Club
 Fenerbahce Fans Group
 Gastronomy Art Club
 Green Crescent Association
 Health Management Group
 Healthy Life Club
 Industrial Engineering and Efficiency Organization
 International Trade and Logistics Group
 LÖSEV Toros Association (Toros Leukemia Association)
 Music Club
 Nutrition Club
 Project and Innovation Club
 Psychology Club
 Radio Club
 Research, Development and Personal Development Group
 Science and Art Club
 Social Media and Photography Group
 The Golden Hands Club
 The New Architects Group
 The New Ones Club
 The Quality Club
 The Young Entepreneurs Club
 Theater Club
 Toros International Plus
 Toros Nature Sports Club
 Toros Technology Club
 Turkish Folk Music Organization
 Ultraaslan Toros Club
 Workshop Club

See also 
 List of universities in Turkey

References

External links 

 Toros University Web Site
 Toros University Facebook Page
 Toros University Instagram Page

Education in Mersin
Private universities and colleges in Turkey
Educational institutions established in 2009
2009 establishments in Turkey
Yenişehir, Mersin